"Do It Again" is a 1972 song composed and performed by American rock group Steely Dan, who released it as a single from their debut album Can't Buy a Thrill. The single version differed from the album version, shortening the intro and outro and omitting the organ solo.

Released in 1972, the song debuted on the Billboard Hot 100 on November 18, 1972, and reached number 6 on the US charts in 1973, making it Steely Dan's second highest-charting single.

Song
"Do It Again" features an electric sitar solo by Denny Dias. The "plastic organ" solo by Donald Fagen was performed on a Yamaha YC-30 with a sliding pitch-bending control. The song is written in the key of G minor and has a tempo of 125 beats per minute. It follows a chord progression of Cm-Dm-E♭-Dm7-Gm-Cm-Dm-E♭-Dm.    

David Palmer fronted the band during their live show, and sang "Do It Again" when the group played The Midnight Special in February 1973. Donald Fagen sang the vocal on the album version.

Cash Box described it as a "fine commercial effort with plenty of potential as a hit record", going on to say that it "is highlighted by some fine vocal harmony and superb arrangement."

Personnel

Steely Dan 
 Donald Fagen – lead vocals, electric piano, plastic (YC-30) organ
 Jeff "Skunk" Baxter – guitar
 Denny Dias – guitar, electric sitar
 Walter Becker – electric bass
 Jim Hodder – drums, percussion

Additional personnel 
 Victor Feldman – percussion

Production
 Gary Katz – producer
 Roger Nichols – engineer
 Tim Weston – assistant engineer
 Doug Sax – mastering engineer

Charts

Weekly charts

Year-end charts

Certifications

Cover versions
In 1973 Brazilian musician Eumir Deodato released a version of this song on his album Deodato 2.
1979: Terry Callier, Turn You to Love.
In 1980 Waylon Jennings released a version of the song on his album Music Man.
In 1981 Israeli singer Gary Eckstein גרי אקשטיין released an Hebrew version of the song on his album Lo Leshidur (Off The Air).
In 1983 Italian group Club House released "Do It Again Medley with Billie Jean,"  a mashup/medley of the track with Michael Jackson's "Billie Jean". The song peaked at number 79 in Australia. It was later covered by the American studio group Slingshot.
Austrian singer Falco covered the song on his 1988 album Wiener Blut. His version was also released as a single.
In 1997 Paul Hardcastle offered his version from the album Cover to Cover.
Smash Mouth covered the song for use in the 2000 movie Me, Myself & Irene.
In 2017 Lydia Lunch and Cypress Grove covered the song on their album Under the Covers.

References

1972 singles
1972 songs
ABC Records singles
EMI Records singles
Funk rock songs
Song recordings produced by Gary Katz
Songs written by Donald Fagen
Songs written by Walter Becker
Steely Dan songs